Brigitte Butscher  (born 18 April 1957) is a German footballer who played for the Germany national team in 1986. On club level she played for SG Aulendorf.

Career 
Butscher was a goalkeeper from 1985 to 1987 for the women's soccer department of SG Aulendorf 1920, founded in 1971 and dissolved in 1987, in the Württemberg Football Association.

After being a long-time player for the Wuerttemberg Football Association select team, she played her only international match for the senior national team on July 27, 1986, against the national team of Iceland. She came on as a second-half substitute for Rosemarie Neuser in the 4–1 win in Kópavogur.

Miscellaneous 
In her free time, she plays tennis at the TC Ösch Weingarten (now SPG Berg/Blitzenreute/Ösch-Weingarten), which was founded in 1983 under the umbrella organization of the Württemberg Tennis Association.

References

External links 

 Brigitte Butscher in the weltfussball.de database
 Brigitte Butscher in the soccerdonna.de database
 Brigitte Butscher in the database of the German Football Association

External links
 
 Profile at soccerdonna.de
 Brigitte Butscher in the weltfussball.de database

1957 births
Living people
German women's footballers
Place of birth missing (living people)
Germany women's international footballers
Women's association football goalkeepers
Association football goalkeepers